

List of notable Indian dentists 
 Rafiuddin Ahmed
 S. M. Balaji
 Meiyang Chang
 Harpinder Singh Chawla
 Hardev Singh Coonar
 Jagannathrao Hegde
 Kaumudi Joshipura
 Anil Kohli
 Sajeev Koshy
 Atluri Sriman Narayana
 Tabitha Solomon
 Vimla Sood
 Amrit Tewari
 Mahesh Verma

Dentists
Dentistry in India
Indian dentists